
The Lisandro Formation, alternatively known as the Cerro Lisandro Formation, is a Late Cretaceous (Late Cenomanian to Early Turonian) geologic formation with outcrops in the Neuquén, Río Negro and Mendoza Provinces of Argentina. It is the youngest formation within the Río Limay Subgroup, the lowest section of the Neuquén Group. Formerly that subgroup was treated as a formation, and the Lisandro Formation was known as the (Cerro) Lisandro Member.

The type locality of the Lisandro Formation is the hill known as Cerro Lisandro in Neuquén Province. This formation conformably overlies the Huincul Formation, and it is in turn overlain by the Portezuelo Formation, which is a part of the Río Neuquén Subgroup.

It is composed of siltstones and claystones, red in color, which have been interpreted as a swampy to fluvial environment. Usually, the red Lisando Formation rocks are easy to distinguish from the greenish or yellowish deposits of the Huincul Formation.

Fossil content 
Not many dinosaurs are represented in the Lisandro Formation; other types of animals are frequently found. Fossils documented from this formation are:
 freshwater bivalve molluscs
 fish (Ceratodus)
 turtles
 a carcharodontosaurid theropod
 crocodilians
 an abelisauroid theropod
 "Bayosaurus pubica"
 at least one bird
 ornithopods (including Anabisetia)
 a peirosaurid Bayomesasuchus hernandezi
 a titanosaur sauropod Quetecsaurus rusconii

See also 
 List of fossil sites
 Bajo Barreal Formation, contemporaneous formation of the Golfo San Jorge Basin
 Mata Amarilla Formation, contemporaneous formation of the Austral Basin
 List of dinosaur bearing rock formations

References

Bibliography 
 
 
 

Geologic formations of Argentina
Neuquén Group
Upper Cretaceous Series of South America
Cretaceous Argentina
Cenomanian Stage
Turonian Stage
Siltstone formations
Shale formations
Fluvial deposits
Fossiliferous stratigraphic units of South America
Paleontology in Argentina
Geology of Mendoza Province
Geology of Neuquén Province
Geology of Río Negro Province